Taylor Allen Montgomery (born January 30, 1995) is an American professional golfer. He plays on the PGA Tour.

Personal life 
The son of Mikella and Monte Montgomery, Montgomery was born in Las Vegas, Nevada on January 30, 1995. His father Monte is originally from Colorado, and was a walk-on golfer at the University of Nevada, Las Vegas. He played for the UNLV Rebels from 1989 to 1992, becoming a second-team All-American. Monte made his sole appearance on the PGA Tour in 1994, after Monday qualifying for the Buick Invitational of California, held at Torrey Pines Golf Course. He finished in 24th place. Monte later became the general manager at Shadow Creek Golf Course in Las Vegas.

Amateur career
Montgomery graduated from Foothill High School in 2013, where he lettered all four years in golf. He won the state's 4A boys high school individual championship in 2011 and 2013. He was also a starter for the school's basketball team, playing from 2011 to 2013 as a forward.

Montgomery then followed in the footsteps of his father and attended the University of Nevada, Las Vegas, where he played collegiate golf. He was coached by the long-time leader of the UNLV golf program, Dwaine Knight. This was the first father-son combination to both have played under Coach Knight. As a sophomore, Montgomery won the 2014 Gene Miranda Falcon Invitational, with a score of 10-under 206, one ahead of AJ McInerney and Yannik Paul.

Montgomery struggled with his golf game in the final two years at university and often could not make the team. He had difficulties keeping the ball in play, causing him to use no more than 2-iron off the tee throughout the entirety of some tournaments. UNLV teammate Harry Hall said Montgomery has "always been a great chipper and putter" but struggled getting the ball to the green during that time. Montgomery majored in communications and graduated in 2017.

Professional career 
Montgomery turned professional in 2017. In October of that year, he won the inaugural Major Series of Putting tournament. He received a prize of $75,000, and also won another $15,000 for winning the team portion of the tournament with his former UNLV teammate Kurt Kitayama. This prize money helped to bankroll Montgomery's burgeoning golf career.

In September 2018, Montgomery birdied the first playoff hole to win the Sand Hollow Leavitt Group Open, a mini-tour event in Utah. This win granted Montgomery an exemption to play in the 2019 Utah Championship on the Web.com Tour.

Professional wins (1)

Other wins (1)

Playoff record
Korn Ferry Tour playoff record (0–1)

Results in major championships

CUT = missed the half-way cut
"T" = tied

Results in The Players Championship

"T" indicates a tie for a place

See also
2022 Korn Ferry Tour Finals graduates

References

External links
 
 

American male golfers
PGA Tour golfers
Golfers from Nevada
Sportspeople from Las Vegas
1995 births
Living people